The 2003 Calgary Stampeders season was the 46th season for the team in the Canadian Football League and their 65th overall. The Stampeders finished in 5th place in the West Division with a 5–13 record and failed to make the playoffs.

Offseason

CFL Draft

Preseason

Regular season

Season Standings

Season schedule

Awards and records

2003 CFL All-Stars
DT – Joe Fleming

References

Calgary Stampeders seasons
Calgary Stampeders Season, 2003
2003 in Alberta